The calcarine sulcus (or calcarine fissure) is an anatomical landmark located at the caudal end of the medial surface of the brain of humans and other primates. Its name comes from the Latin "calcar" meaning "spur". It is very deep, and known as a complete sulcus.

Structure 
The calcarine sulcus begins near the occipital pole in two converging rami. It runs forward to a point a little below the splenium of the corpus callosum. Here, it is joined at an acute angle by the medial part of the parieto-occipital sulcus. The anterior part of this sulcus gives rise to the prominence of the calcar avis in the posterior cornu of the lateral ventricle. The cuneus is above the calcarine sulcus, while the lingual gyrus is below it.

Development 
In humans, the calcarine sulcus usually becomes visible between 20 weeks and 28 weeks of gestation.

Function 
The calcarine sulcus is associated with visual cortex. It is where the primary visual cortex (V1) is concentrated. The central visual field is located in the posterior portion of the calcarine sulcus, and the peripheral visual field is located in the anterior portion.

History 
The name of the calcarine sulcus comes from the Latin "calcar" meaning "spur".

Additional images

References

External links 

 
 https://web.archive.org/web/20090310124713/http://www2.umdnj.edu/~neuro/studyaid/Practical2000/Q31.htm
  - "The Visual Pathway from Below"
 NIF Search - Calcarine Fissure via the Neuroscience Information Framework

Sulci (neuroanatomy)
Medial surface of cerebral hemisphere
Occipital lobe
Anatomic Landmarks